Hayes School is a mixed secondary school with academy status located in the suburb of Hayes within the London Borough of Bromley.

The school has approximately 1800 students, of whom 500 are in the sixth form.

History 
The school became independent from the local Parish school in Hayes village in 1956. At this time, the school took solely male students and consisted only of Gadsden, a Victorian Gothic mansion which now houses the present day Reception, schools offices, et cetera. Soon after its opening, the school accepted students of both sexes and was mostly relocated to what is now known as A block.  Further expansion followed culminating in the opening of a new C block (containing a state of the art Library unique to London at the time) and a vastly improved Music Department in 2003, and a new L block in 2006, where the School celebrated its fiftieth Anniversary with a fair, which also acted as a Fundraising event. Now there is a newly opened block for Media Studies, Drama, the Library etc. M-Block, opened in the summer of 2010 and was developed over a short-year's period from March to September.

The school gained academy status on 1 April 2011.

The school's two most recent Ofsted Reports, in 2011 and 2013, both awarded the school Outstanding status.

School buildings 
The school has 10 different blocks (A, B, C, D, E, G, H, L, M, S): the newest block (M) was opened in 2010. Most blocks are split into two floors.

A Block – A block is dedicated to Science; biology, chemistry and physics.

B Block – Used for many subjects. Design Technology taking up the ground floor, while upstairs is used for Art, mostly, with one classroom used for Information Technology.

C Block – Two floors. The lower floor is used for Music Business Studies, Drama, Psychology and Sociology. The first floor is used for IT, with three music practice rooms, a recording studio and a store room to house students' instruments.

D Block – Lower floor is used for MFL (Modern Foreign Languages. Primarily French, which all students must learn, and German and Spanish, which one 'side' of a year is taught each). The first floor is used for Humanities (History, Religious Education, and Geography) and Social Sciences (Politics, Sociology, Law, Government and Politics & Psychology). At the end of D Block on the ground floor is the main Sixth Form Study Centre, split with a common room area (canteen included) for Sixth Form students and a silent study room with computers.

E Block – Dance Studio.

G Block – Gadsden. This is an old house that has been renovated into two reception areas, one main and one for students. It also houses many offices, with a medical room on the bottom floor, next to the Student Reception.

H – H Block, otherwise known as the 'Huts'. H1 is a classroom where Spanish and Geography is taught, H2 is used for counselling and student support, H3 and H4 are part of the Bromley School Collegiate teaching school and H5 and H6 are sixth form study areas.

L – L Block, used for English classes.

M – M block is used for a variety of subjects, including: English, Mathematics, Media and Drama. Transition, Student Support and Speech & Language are on the ground floor. The school library is on the ground floor of M Block.

S – S Block is used by the PE Department including a sports hall, four changing rooms (2 boys, 2 girls) and a multi purpose hall which can also be used for assemblies.

Notable former pupils

Alex Blake (cricketer) - cricketer 
Lynsey Askew – cricketer
Andrew Davenport – co creator of the Teletubbies
Lydia Greenway – cricketer
Gary Johnson – rugby union player
Richard Preddy – comedy writer
David Spinx – actor 
Pete Sears – musician, producer
Finn Jones – Actor, Game of Thrones
Jessica Plummer - actress, singer

References

External links 
 

Academies in the London Borough of Bromley
Educational institutions established in 1956
1956 establishments in England
Secondary schools in the London Borough of Bromley